Gerald Sherry was an American football fullback who played one season in the National Football League with the Louisville Colonels.

External links
Just Sports Stats

Year of birth missing
Year of death missing
American football fullbacks
Louisville Colonels (NFL) players